The national symbols of Tajikistan are defined in Article 3 of the Constitution of Tajikistan. They consist of the flag, the coat of arms, and the national anthem.

The national anthem 

"Surudi Milli" is the national anthem of Tajikistan, officially adopted in 1991. The lyrics were written by Gulnazar Keldi and the music by Suleiman Yudakov, the same melody from the Anthem of the Tajik Soviet Socialist Republic. Note the Cyrillic script is the only official script of the country and the Perso-Arabic script is not well known in the country itself and is just provided as a comparison to the Tajik language since it is a dialect of Persian.

Lyrics:

External links 
 Tajikistan: Surudi Milli - Audio of the national anthem of Tajikistan, with information and lyrics
 Himnuszok - A vocal version of the Anthem with the current lyrics, featured in Szbszig's "Himnuszok" website.
 Vocal of "Surudi Milli" with Soviet lyrics
 MIDI file

 
Tajikistan
Tajikistani music
1946 songs